Heavy Rhyme Experience, Vol. 1 is a 1992 studio album by the Brand New Heavies. It includes collaborations with Main Source, Gang Starr, Grand Puba, Masta Ace, Jamalski, Kool G. Rap, Black Sheep, Ed O.G., Tiger, and The Pharcyde.

Track listing

Personnel
 Simon Bartholomew – guitar
 Andrew Levy – bass guitar
 Jan Kincaid – drums
 Paul Daley – percussion
 Mike Smith – saxophone
 Martin Shaw – trumpet

Charts

References

External links
 

1992 albums
The Brand New Heavies albums
Delicious Vinyl albums